Mehmed III (Meḥmed-i sālis; ; 26 May 1566 – 22 December 1603) was Sultan of the Ottoman Empire from 1595 until his death in 1603. Mehmed was known for ordering the execution of his brothers and leading the army in the Long Turkish war, during which the Ottoman army was victorious at the decisive Battle of Keresztes. This victory was however undermined by some military losses such as in Gyor and Nikopol. He also ordered the successful quelling of the Jelali rebellions. The sultan also communicated with the court of Elizabeth I on the grounds of stronger commercial relations and in the hopes of England to ally with the Ottomans against the Spanish.

Early life 
Mehmed was born at the Manisa Palace in 1566, during the reign of his great-grandfather, Suleiman the Magnificent. He was the son of Murad III, himself the son of Selim II, who was the son of Sultan Suleiman and Hurrem Sultan. His mother was Safiye Sultan, an Albanian from the Dukagjin highlands. His great-grandfather Suleiman I died the year he was born, and his grandfather became the new sultan, Selim II. His grandfather Selim II died when Mehmed was eight, and Mehmed's father, Murad III, became sultan in 1574. Murad died in 1595, when Mehmed was 28 years old.

Mehmed spent most of his time in Manisa with his father Murad and mother Safiye, his first teacher Ibrahim Efendi. His circumcision took place on 29 May 1582 when he was 16 years old.

Reign

Fratricide 
Upon ascending to the throne, Mehmed III ordered that all of his nineteen brothers be executed. They were strangled by his royal executioners, many of whom were deaf, mute or 'half-witted' to ensure absolute loyalty. Fratricidal successions were not unprecedented, as sultans would often have dozens of children with their concubines.

Power struggle in Constantinople 
Mehmed III was an idle ruler, leaving government to his mother Safiye Sultan, the valide sultan. His first major problem was the rivalry between two of his viziers, Serdar Ferhad Pasha and Koca Sinan Pasha, and their supporters. His mother and her son-in-law Damat Ibrahim Pasha supported Koca Sinan Pasha and prevented Mehmed III from taking control of the issue himself. The issue grew to cause major disturbances by janissaries. On 7 July 1595, Mehmed III finally sacked Serdar Ferhad Pasha from the position of Grand Vizier due to his failure in Wallachia and replaced him with Sinan.

Austro-Hungarian War 

The major event of his reign was the Austro-Ottoman War in Hungary (1593–1606). Ottoman defeats in the war caused Mehmed III to take personal command of the army, the first sultan to do so since Suleiman I in 1566. Accompanied by the Sultan, the Ottomans conquered Eger in 1596. Upon hearing of the Habsburg army's approach, Mehmed wanted to dismiss the army and return to Istanbul. However, the Ottomans eventually decided to face the enemy and defeated the Habsburg and Transylvanian forces at the Battle of Keresztes (known in Ottoman Turkish as the Battle of Haçova), during which the Sultan had to be dissuaded from fleeing the field halfway through the battle. Upon returning to Istanbul in victory, Mehmed told his viziers that he would campaign again. The next year the Venetian Bailo in Istanbul noted, "the doctors declared that the Sultan cannot leave for a war on account of his bad health, produced by excesses of eating and drinking".

In reward for his services at the war, Cigalazade Yusuf Sinan Pasha was made Grand Vizier in 1596. However, with pressure from the court and his mother, Mehmed reinstated Damat Ibrahim Pasha to this position shortly afterward.

However, the victory at the Battle of Keresztes was soon set back by some important losses, including the loss of Győr to the Austrians and the defeat of the Ottoman forces led by Hafız Ahmet Pasha by the Wallachian forces under Michael the Brave in Nikopol in 1599. In 1600, Ottoman forces under Tiryaki Hasan Pasha captured Nagykanizsa after a 40-day siege and later successfully held it against a much greater attacking force in the Siege of Nagykanizsa.

Jelali revolts 
Another major event of his reign was the Jelali revolts in Anatolia. Karayazıcı Abdülhalim, a former Ottoman official, captured the city of Urfa and declared himself a sultan in 1600. The rumors of his claim to the throne spread to Constantinople and Mehmed ordered the rebels to be treated harshly to dispel the rumors, among these, was the execution of Hüseyin Pasha, whom Karayazıcı Abdülhalim styled as Grand Vizier. In 1601, Abdülhalim fled to the vicinity of Samsun after being defeated by the forces under Sokulluzade Hasan Pasha, the governor of Baghdad. However, his brother, Deli Hasan, killed Sokulluzade Hasan Pasha and defeated troops under the command of Hadım Hüsrev Pasha. He then marched on to Kütahya, captured and burned the city.

Relationship with England
In 1599, the fourth year of Mehmed III's reign, Queen Elizabeth I sent a convoy of gifts to the Ottoman court. These gifts were originally intended for the sultan's predecessor, Murad III, who had died before they had arrived. Included in these gifts was a large jewel-studded clockwork organ that was assembled on the slope of the Royal Private Garden by a team of engineers including Thomas Dallam. The organ took many weeks to complete and featured dancing sculptures such as a flock of blackbirds that sung and shook their wings at the end of the music. Also among the English gifts was a ceremonial coach, accompanied by a letter from the Queen to Mehmed's mother, Safiye Sultan. These gifts were intended to cement relations between the two countries, building on the trade agreement signed in 1581 that gave English merchants priority in the Ottoman region. Under the looming threat of Spanish military presence, England was eager to secure an alliance with the Ottomans, the two nations together having the capability to divide the power. Elizabeth's gifts arrived in a large 27-gun merchantman ship that Mehmed personally inspected, a clear display of English maritime strength that would prompt him to build up his fleet over the following years of his reign. The Anglo-Ottoman alliance would never be consummated, however, as relations between the nations grew stagnant due to anti-European sentiments reaped from the worsening Austro-Ottoman War and the deaths of Safiye Sultan's interpreter and the pro-English chief Hasan Pasha.

Death
Mehmed died on 22 December 1603 at the age of 37. According to one source, the cause of his death was the distress caused by the death of his son, Şehzade Mahmud. According to another source, he died either of plague or of stroke. He was buried in Hagia Sophia Mosque. He was succeeded by his son Ahmed I as the new sultan.

Family

Consorts
Mehmed III had three known concubines, none of whom, according to the harem records, held the title of Haseki Sultan:
 Handan Hatun (died 9 November 1605, Topkapı Palace, Istanbul, buried in Mehmed III Mausoleum, Hagia Sophia Mosque). She was mother and Valide sultan of Ahmed I. 
 Halime Hatun (buried in Mustafa I Mausoleum, Hagia Sophia Mosque, Istanbul). She was mother and Valide Sultan of Mustafa I. 
 A consort who died in 1598 with her infant son during the outbreak of plague ;

Sons
Mehmed III had at least eight sons:
Şehzade Selim (1585, Manisa Palace, Manisa – 1597 or 1598, Topkapı Palace, Istanbul, buried in Hagia Sophia Mosque) - with Handan. He died of disease. 
 Şehzade Süleyman ( 1586, Manisa Palace, Manisa, - 1597 or 1598, Topkapi Palace, Istanbul, buried in Hagia Sophia Mosque) - with Handan. He died of disease.
Şehzade Mahmud (1587, Manisa Palace, Manisa – executed by Mehmed III, 7 June 1603, Topkapı Palace, Istanbul, buried in Şehzade Mahmud Mausoleum, Şehzade Mosque) - with Halime.
 Ahmed I (18 April 1590, Manisa Palace, Manisa – 22 November 1617, Topkapı Palace, Istanbul, buried in Ahmed I Mausoleum, Sultan Ahmed Mosque) - with Handan. Sultan of the Ottoman Empire. 
Şehzade Osman ( 1597, Topkapı Palace, Istanbul –  1601, Topkapı Palace, Istanbul, buried in Hagia Sophia Mosque) - with Handan.
Şehzade Fülan ( 1597/1598, Topkapi Palace, Istanbul - 1598, Topkapi Palace, Istanbul, buried in Hagia Sophia Mosque) - with the third nameless consort. 
Şehzade Cihangir (1599, Topkapı Palace, Istanbul – 1602, Topkapı Palace, Istanbul, buried in Hagia Sophia Mosque);
 Mustafa I ( 1600/1601, Topkapi Palace, Constantinople – 20 January 1639, Eski Palace, Istanbul, buried in Mustafa I Mausoleum, Hagia Sophia Mosque) - with Halime. Sultan of the Ottoman Empire.

Daughters
Mehmed III had at least ten daughters:
Fatma Sultan (1584?, Manisa - ?) - with Handan. She married firstly in 1600 with Mahmud Pasha, sanjakbey of Cairo, secondly in 1604 to Damat Tiryaki Hasan Pasha (d. 1611) and had a son and two daughters, finally in 1616 to Güzelce Ali Pasha, Grand Vizier, until his death in 1621.
Ayşe Sultan ( 1587? - after 1614) - with Handan. She married firstly to Destari Mustafa Pasha, with whom she had a son and two daughters died in infancy. Some sources also suggest that she remarried to Gazi Hüsrev Pasha
Hatice Sultan (1588?, Manisa - 1613, Constantinople) - with Halime. She married firstly in 1604 to Damat Mirahur Mustafa Pasha, married secondly in 1612 to Sultanzade Mahmud Pasha, son of Cigalazade Sinan Pasha and Saliha Hanimsultan (daughter of Ayşe Hümaşah Sultan, granddaughter of Sultan Suleyman I). She died soon after her second marriage. 
Beyhan Sultan (born before 1590, Manisa). She married in 1612 to Damat Halil Pasha.
Şah Sultan (1590?, Manisa - After 1623, Constantinople) - with Halime. She married in 1604 (consumed in March 1606) to Damat Kara Davud Pasha, Grand Vizier. She had a son and a daughter. 
Hümaşah Sultan (? - ?). She married in October 1612 to Cagaloglu Mahmud Pasha.
 Esra Sultan (? - ?) - unknown mother. She did not appear among the unmarried princesses in a 1622 dated list, which means that she was either married or already dead in that year. 
 Ümmügülsüm Sultan (? - after 1622) - unknown mother. Also called Ümmikülsum Sultan, she was among the unmarried princesses in 1622.
 Halime Sultan (? - after 1622) - unknown mother, disputed. She was among the unmarried princesses in 1622.
 Akile Sultan (? - after 1622) - unknown mother, disputed. She was among the unmarried princesses in 1622.

References

External links
 

[aged 37]

1566 births
1603 deaths
16th-century Ottoman sultans
17th-century Ottoman sultans
Turks from the Ottoman Empire
People of the Long Turkish War
Custodian of the Two Holy Mosques